Herbert Heslip (1913 in Ballinaskeagh, near Banbridge, County Down – 1992) was a Northern Irish politician with the Ulster Unionist Party (UUP).

Heslip was a well-known figure in County Down Unionism, serving as a member of Down District Council from 1968 to 1973 and then of Banbridge District Council until 1985. 

Following the death of Raymond McCullough in 1985 Heslip attempted to regain his seat in a by-election but was defeated by McCullough's daughter, Vivienne.

Heslip was elected to the Northern Ireland Assembly of 1973, serving as Deputy Speaker, and also sat in its successor the Northern Ireland Constitutional Convention, in both cases for South Down. By conviction, however, he supported a return to the Parliament of Northern Ireland. He also served as Vice-President of the loyalist vigilante group Down Orange Welfare.

References

1913 births
1992 deaths
Ulster Unionist Party councillors
Members of the Northern Ireland Assembly 1973–1974
Members of the Northern Ireland Constitutional Convention
Members of Down District Council
Members of Banbridge District Council
Farmers from Northern Ireland
People from Banbridge
Place of death missing
Date of birth missing
Date of death missing